The 2020 Georgia Southern Eagles baseball team represented Georgia Southern Eagles in the 2020 NCAA Division I baseball season. The Eagles played their home games at J. I. Clements Stadium and were led by twentieth year head coach Rodney Hennon.

On March 12, the Sun Belt Conference announced the indefinite suspension of all spring athletics, including baseball, due to the increasing risk of the COVID-19 pandemic.

Preseason

Signing Day Recruits

Sun Belt Conference Coaches Poll
The Sun Belt Conference Coaches Poll was released sometime on January 30, 2020 and the Eagles were picked to finish third in the East Division and sixth overall in the conference.

Preseason All-Sun Belt Team & Honors
Drake Nightengale (USA, Sr, Pitcher)
Zach McCambley (CCU, Jr, Pitcher)
Levi Thomas (TROY, Jr, Pitcher)
Andrew Papp (APP, Sr, Pitcher)
Jack Jumper (ARST, Sr, Pitcher)
Kale Emshoff (LR, RS-Jr, Catcher)
Kaleb DeLatorre (USA, Sr, First Base)
Luke Drumheller (APP, So, Second Base)
Hayden Cantrelle (LA, Jr, Shortstop)
Garrett Scott (LR, RS-Sr, Third Base)
Mason McWhorter (GASO, Sr, Outfielder)
Ethan Wilson (USA, So, Outfielder)
Rigsby Mosley (TROY, Jr, Outfielder)
Will Hollis (TXST, Sr, Designated Hitter)
Andrew Beesley (ULM, Sr, Utility)

Personnel

Roster

Coaching staff

Schedule and results

Schedule Source:
*Rankings are based on the team's current ranking in the D1Baseball poll.

References

Georgia Southern
Georgia Southern Eagles baseball seasons
Georgia Southern Eagles baseball